The Manichaean Painting of the Buddha Jesus, is a Chinese Southern Song dynasty silk hanging scroll preserved at the Seiunji Temple in Kōshū, Yamanashi, Japan. It measures 153.5 cm in height, 58.7 cm in width, dates from the 12th to 13th centuries, and depicts a solitary nimbate figure on a dark-brown medieval Chinese silk. According to the Hungarian historian Zsuzsanna Gulácsi, this painting is one of the six documented Chinese Manichaean hanging scrolls from Zhejiang province from the early 12th century, which titled  (lit. "Silk Painting of the Buddha [Prophet] Jesus").

Description 

The painting depicts a monumental, solitary figure, with glittering lines of gold and various colours. The upper half is occupied by a cloaked deity seated in lotus position and hands held close to one another in front of the chest. He is holding in his left hand a red lotus pedestal on where a small gold cross (Cross of Light) is seated. In addition to the nimbus around the head, there is a faint outline of a large mandorla that frames the body and reaches the upwards, where a tasselled canopy hung above the nimbus. The lower half is filled by an elaborate pedestal, which is a multilayered hexagonal stand supporting a lotus with lush sets of petals that open in five orderly rings. Each petal evokes the form of a miniature altar.

Background 
According to the Song Huiyao Jigao, there were six paintings in the possession of a Chinese Manichaean church used as objects of learning and veneration:
 Silk painting of the buddha Wonderful Water
 Silk painting of the buddha First Thought
 Silk painting of the buddha Jesus
 Silk painting of Good and Evil
 Silk painting of the Royal Prince
 Silk painting of the Four Kings of Heaven

History 
The history of this hanging scroll represents a unique case of religious metamorphosis, for it has been used by three religions. It can be divided into three episodes: before ca. 1552, the image was venerated by Manichaeans from southern China. From 1552 (or 1608) to 1612, during this period of sixty years (at most), the painting functioned as a Christian object in Japan. No written records, only legend at Seiunji Temple, suggests that the painting belonged to an executed Christian daimyō Arima Harunobu, before it ended up in the Buddhist temple. The most recent, which has lasted approximately four hundred years, when the scroll has been used as a Buddhist work of art in the Seiunji Temple in Japan. The Japanese Buddhists considered it a depiction of Ākāśagarbha, a celestial bodhisattva worshipped in Esoteric Buddhism.

Analysis 

The painting was identified earlier by the Japanese art historian  as a Yuan dynasty Christian work of art. Zsuzsanna Gulácsi notes that the highly sinicised character of this painting weakens this idea, "since Nestorian Christianity in China maintained a foreign identity and produced art with relatively small degree of integration compared to the arts of other originally foreign but later fully integrated religions, such as Buddhism and Manichaeism."

After studying and comparing the scroll with a number of Buddhist, Church of the East Christian and Manichaean works of art, Gulácsi concluded in her article A Manichaean Portrait of the Buddha Jesus: Identifying a Twelfth-Thirteenth-century Chinese Painting from the Collection of Seiun-ji Zen Temple, that the painting is a Manichaean work of art:

Excursus 

Eight silk hanging scrolls with Manichaean didactic images from southern China from between the 12th and the 15th centuries, which can be divided into four categories:
 Two single portraits (depicting Mani and Jesus)
 Icon of Mani
 Manichaean Painting of the Buddha Jesus
 One scroll depicting Salvation Theory
 Sermon on Mani's Teaching of Salvation
 Four scrolls depicting Prophetology
 Mani's Parents
 Birth of Mani
 Episodes from Mani's Missionary Work
 Mani's Community Established
 One scroll depicting Cosmology
 Manichaean Diagram of the Universe

See also 
 Chinese Manichaeism
 Painting of a Christian figure

Notes

References

External links 

Chinese Manichaean art
Iconography of Jesus
Religious paintings
Song dynasty paintings
12th-century paintings
13th-century paintings